Eiter may refer to:

 Eiter (River), River in Lower Saxony, Germany
 Eiter, Luxembourg, town in the Commune of Contern

Eiter is a surname. Notable people with the surname include:

 Nicolas Eiter (born 1996), German footballer
 Angela Eiter (born 1986), Austrian climber
 Rob Eiter (born 1967), American Wrestler
 Robert Eiter[De] (born 1960), Austrian anti-fascist